Buck House was a gallery on Madison Avenue in the Carnegie Hill neighborhood of Manhattan's Upper East Side.  The gallery opened in November 2001 and was owned and operated by artist Deborah Buck.

History
The gallery displayed and sold fine art and design objects, said to be among the “finest examples of design from the 19th century to the present.”

In 2006, Buck House launched a second, much larger space nearby called The Gallery at Buck House.  This exhibition space hosted fine art exhibitions, book release parties, and events to benefit charitable organizations.  In September 2009, however, Buck House closed its two locations in favor of one, much larger space on Madison Avenue which combined both The Gallery at Buck House and Buck House under one roof.  “The idea” said Buck in a 2010 interview, “was to create a meeting place and a salon like those in 1920s Paris.”  In September 2012 Buck House closed its bricks and mortar home but continued on the internet.

Buck House Gallery exhibitions
Manhattan/Glamour, 2006, an exhibition of photographs, sculpture, paintings, and drawings, curated by Charlie Scheips.
 Gem, March 2007, an exhibition of treasures from the archive of the Illustration House. Curated by Charlie Scheips.
 Wild Flowers, September 2007 an exhibition that explores the visual power of the flower in paintings, furniture and decorative art. Curated by Deborah Buck.
 Roger Jazilek – An Exhibition of Paintings, September 2008. Curated by Deborah Buck.
 The Design Entrepreneur Book Launch Party, November 2008. The projects in The Design Entrepreneur reveal the ways that designers put their ideas into marketable forms.
 Autumn Hues, Lavenders & Blues, October 2009. Wearable Art/Janis Provisor applies her personal style to jewels.
 Elle Decor Celebrates the New Buck House, November 2009. Margaret Russell, editor-in-chief of Elle Decor, hosted the opening of Buck House at its new location at 1318 Madison Avenue and 93rd Street.
 Juan Montoya – Book Launch Party, December 2009
 Launch of Rocknrola Jewelry in NYC, February 2010. From Susan Cohn Rockefeller and Carola Mack, Rocknrola designs. Oceana benefit party.
 Indian Summer – Benefit Party, May 2010. A philanthropic endeavor for Buck House, profits went to Aid to Artisans, a nonprofit organization which champions the handmade arts and their artisans throughout the world.
 Garden Party, July 2010. Garden Party celebrates Buck House's first guest designer for the Buck House Window Project with the window installation, "Garden Party" by John Danzer for Munder Skiles.
 Haresh Lalvani: XtraD, April 2011
 Gwyneth Leech, The Cup Drawing Installation: Hypergraphia, June 2011

Deborah Buck
Trained as a painter and set designer, Deborah's style is reflected in the grouping of objects at Buck House. Buck originated the concept for 'Buck House Moments': a series of curated still-life photographs including antiques, fine art and floral arrangements. An eclectic assemblage of objects, or tableaux, highlight shared formal characteristics between objects and design a moment in the world of Buck House. Exhibitions, revolving window displays, and tableaux developed at Buck House have inspired books such as Tableau and Fictional Females of Buck House and allow the public to explore, appreciate and interpret design in everyday life.

In 2013 she published The Windows of Buck House ; Fabulous, Fictional Females to great acclaim.

References

External links 
 

Art museums and galleries in Manhattan
Art galleries established in 2001
2001 establishments in New York City